Hyderabad–Badin Branch Line is one of several branch lines in Pakistan, operated and maintained by Pakistan Railways. The line begins from Kotri Junction station or Hyderabad Junction station and ends at Badin station. There are 9 railway stations from Kotri Junction to Badin.

History

The Hyderabad–Badin Railway opened on 15 August 1904 as part of the North Western State Railway's expansion program. However owing to World War I, financial stringency stagnated developments of the railways. In order to meet the necessities of the military authorities, this rail line (along with the Lodhran–Kasur Railway) was dismantled in 1917 during World War I, as the rails were needed elsewhere. In 1922, the track was rebuilt to its present alignment.

Stations
The stations on this line are as follows:
 Kotri Junction
 Hyderabad Junction
 Zeal Pak
 Kathar
 Norai Sharif (Closed)
 Tando Muhammad
 Matli
 Palh
 Talhar
 Badin

See also
 Karachi–Peshawar Railway Line
 Railway lines in Pakistan

References

Railway stations on Hyderabad–Badin Branch Line
5 ft 6 in gauge railways in Pakistan